is a Japanese film director. He won the award for Best Director at the 20th Yokohama Film Festival for Ganbatte Ikimasshoi.

Filmography
 Ganbatte Ikimasshoi (1998)
 Amemasu no Kawa (2004 )
 Okāsan no Ki (2015)

References

1950 births
Living people
Japanese film directors
People from Gifu Prefecture